Buddy Ross (born Josiah Sherman; March 4, 1983) is an American record producer, musical artist, keyboard player, songwriter, engineer and mixer. He is best known for his work with Frank Ocean, having worked across Ocean's critically acclaimed albums Blonde, Endless and subsequent singles "Provider" and "Moon River". Ross has also written and produced songs for various artists including Bon Iver, Vampire Weekend, Miley Cyrus, HAIM, Wet, Banks, Troye Sivan and more.

Ross produced, mixed and played piano on Vampire Weekend's 2018 Grammy Award winning album Father of the Bride. He co-wrote "Jelmore" with Justin Vernon on Bon Iver's Grammy Award nominated album i,i  and co-wrote & co-produced "I Know Alone" on Haim's Grammy Award nominated album Women in Music Pt. III.

His single "Running Around" was heavily sampled throughout Frank Ocean's 2016 album, Blonde.

Career 

Ross was born and raised in Kelso, WA. He studied classical piano from age 5 to 15 and began composing music on the piano at the age of 9 before moving into electronic music in his mid teens.

In 2009 Ross produced and mixed his first album for Tacoma, Washington artist Daniel Blue. Together they formed the band Motopony, self-released the album and were later signed by TinyOGRE in 2011. They toured the US extensively from 2010 to 2012. Motopony's self-titled debut charted at #1 on KCRW and on the CMJ 200 chart in 2011. In 2012, as they were in the process of recording their second album, Ross received a call from Motopony's former tour manager requesting he fly down to Los Angeles to try out for Frank Ocean’s band the day before Ocean’s Channel Orange would release and one week before the tour would commence. After landing the position as Ocean's keyboardist, Ross performed on the Channel Orange tour and live on SNL with Ocean and John Mayer that same year. He would ultimately leave Motopony to continue to tour with Frank Ocean through 2017.

In 2013, Ocean brought Ross to the studio to write and play keyboards on his critically acclaimed albums Blonde and  Endless. Ocean sampled Ross's song "Running Around" as the recurring theme to Blonde on the songs "Be Yourself", "Good Guy", "Facebook Story", and "Interviews".

In 2014 Ocean released a voice memo as his first follow up song to Channel Orange titled "Memrise" on Ocean's Tumblr. "Memrise" was co-written with and produced by Ross.

In 2017 Ross music directed and played keyboards for the nine Frank Ocean festival headlining slots in support of Blonde. While on that tour, Ross and Ocean co-wrote and co-produced "Provider" from their various hotel rooms.

Ross would later go on to write, produce, play keys and mix for artists including Vampire Weekend, HAIM, Vegyn, Carly Rae Jepsen, Troye Sivan, WET amongst others.

As an artist, Buddy Ross has released three singles; "Running Around" in 2016 and "Green Light" and "Bored Again!" in 2020, the latter two released through Vegyn's label PLZ Make It Ruins.

Ross resides in Portland, Oregon where he records music and enjoys fly fishing.

Discography

Singles

Songwriting and production discography

References 

Living people
Year of birth missing (living people)
Songwriters from Washington (state)
Record producers from Washington (state)
Mixing engineers
21st-century American keyboardists